The 1932 BYU Cougars football team was an American football team that represented Brigham Young University (BYU) as a member of the Rocky Mountain Conference (RMC) during the 1932 college football season. In their fifth season under head coach G. Ott Romney, the Cougars compiled an overall record of 8–1 with a mark of 5–1 against conference opponents, finished second in the RMC, and outscored opponents by a total of 188 to 50. The team's only loss was to rival Utah.

Lloyd Shields was the team captain. Four BYU players received honors on the 1932 All-Rocky Mountain Conference football teams selected by the United Press (UP) and The Salt Lake Telegram (SLT): Shields (UP 1st-team guard); Vernon Richardson (SLT 1st-team tackle; UP 2nd-team guard); Burle Robison (UP and SLT second-team end); and George Bertotti (UP and SLT second-team halfback).

Vice President Charles Curtis attended the annual rivalry game with Utah.

Schedule

References

BYU
BYU Cougars football seasons
BYU Cougars football